Campioni may refer to:

 Campioni (surname)
 Neodythemis campioni, a species of dragonfly